William James Booth is a professor in the department of political science and in the department of philosophy at Vanderbilt University.

W. James Booth earned a PhD from Harvard University (Department of Government) in 1982.

Selected publications
 Communities of Memory. On Witness, Identity, and Justice, Cornell University Press, 2006, 
"Maîtres chez nous: Some questions about culture and continuity. A response to Alan Patten's "Rethinking culture: the social lineage account." American Political Science Review 107(2013)
 "From this Far Place: On Justice and Absence," American Political Science Review 105(2011): 750–764.
 "The Color of Memory: Reading Race with Ralph Ellison." Political Theory 36(2008): 683–707.
 "The Work of Memory: Time, Identity, and Justice." Social Research 75(2008): 237–262.
 Communities of Memory: On Witness, Identity, and Justice. New York: Cornell University Press, 2006.
 "The Unforgotten. Memories of Justice." American Political Science Review 95(2001): 777–791.
 Foreigners: Insiders, Outsiders and the Ethics of Membership. Review of Politics 59(1997):259-292

External links
 Dr. William James Booth web page.

Living people
Academic staff of McGill University
Political science educators
Vanderbilt University faculty
Political philosophers
Year of birth missing (living people)
Harvard Graduate School of Arts and Sciences alumni
American political scientists